This article gives an overview of liberalism in India.

History
Soon after Indian independence, Chakravarthi Rajagopalachari (informally called Rajaji), began to see the risks to India of letting Nehru's fervor for socialism go unchallenged. Rajaji parted ways with the Indian National Congress in 1957 and formed the Swatantra Party which supported classical liberal principles and free enterprise. Since then, many new thinkers such as S. V. Raju, Sharad Anantrao Joshi, Barun Mitra, Lok Satta Jayaprakash Narayan, Parth J. Shah, Gurcharan Das, and Sauvik Chakraverti, Raghavendar Askani, Venkatesh Geriti, among others, have emerged on the Indian liberal scene, contributing to the debate on freedom in India, and advancing classical liberalism.

Economic liberalisation

India's first attempt at economic liberalisation was carried out in 1966 as a precondition to an increase in foreign aid.

The economic liberalisation of 1991, initiated by then-Prime Minister of India P. V. Narasimha Rao in response to a balance-of-payments crisis, did away with the Licence Raj and ended many public monopolies, allowing automatic approval of foreign direct investment in many sectors.

Liberal organisations
 Swatantrata Center

Prominent Indian liberals 
Dr. Jayaprakash Narayan (Lok Satta Party)
Amartya Sen

References

External links
Centre for Civil Society
India Policy Institute.
Indian Liberals 
Swatantrata Center

 
Political history of India
Indian political philosophy